From List of National Natural Landmarks, these are the National Natural Landmarks in South Dakota.  

South Dakota
National Natural Landmarks